The Great Landowners of Great Britain and Ireland (originally The Acre-Ocracy of England) is a reference work published by John Bateman in four editions between 1876 and 1883, giving brief details of individuals owning land in the United Kingdom of Great Britain and Ireland to a total of  or valuation of £3000 annual income. It has become a standard primary source for historians of the Victorian era.

Compilation
The information was abstracted from the Return of Owners of Land (1873–1876), a government publication nicknamed the "Modern Domesday Book". Bateman collated the county-by-county information, correcting errors, allowing for variations in spelling of surnames, noting with footnotes and asterisks discrepancies and complexities of ownership or income. Owners noted in Evelyn Shirley's Noble and Gentle Men of England as in unbroken possession since the reign of Henry VII were given a special mark; later editions also separately marked owners not listed by Shirley but who protested to Bateman that they had the same antiquity.

John Bateman
John Bateman (1839–1910), editor of The Great Landowners of Great Britain and Ireland, lived at Brightlingsea Hall in Essex, and was a justice of the peace and deputy lieutenant for Essex and Staffordshire. In 1865 he married Jessy Caroline Bootle-Wilbraham, sister of Edward Bootle-Wilbraham, 1st Earl of Lathom. He left one daughter.

References

Editions

Sources
 Obituary in The Times, October 13, 1910.
 Spring "Introduction" in Bateman 1971

Citations

History of agriculture in the United Kingdom
British biographical dictionaries
British landowners
1876 non-fiction books
1883 non-fiction books